FC Druzhba Maykop is a Russian association football club from Maykop, Republic of Adygea, founded in 1963. It is playing in the FNL 2. Their biggest achievement was reaching the semifinal of the Russian Cup in the 1992/93 cycle. The club was known as Urozhai Maykop from 1963 to 1968.

Current squad 
As of 22 February 2023, according to the Second League website.

Reserve squad 

Druzhba's reserve squad played professionally as Druzhba-d Maykop and Kommunalnik-Druzhba-d Maykop in the Russian Third League in 1995 and 1996 respectively.

References

External links 

  

Association football clubs established in 1963
Football clubs in Russia
Sport in Maykop
1963 establishments in Russia